Reuben ben Mordecai Brainin (March 16, 1862 – November 30, 1939) was a Russian Jewish publicist, biographer and literary critic.

Biography

Brainin contributed to the periodicals Ha-Meliẓ, Ha-Toren, Ha-Ẓefirah, Ha-Maggid, and Ha-Shiloaḥ. In 1895 he issued a periodical under the title "Mi-Mizraḥ u-Mi-Ma-arav" (From East and West), of which only four numbers appeared.

Brainin was the author of several pamphlets, the most important of which were his sketch of Pereẓ Smolenskin's life and works (Warsaw, 1896); and a translation of M. Lazarus' essay on Jeremiah (Warsaw, 1897). He also wrote about one hundred biographical sketches of modern Jewish scholars and writers. He was the first biographer of Theodor Herzl
He died in New York City.

Published works
To "Aḥiasaf" Brainin contributed the following articles:
 "Ilane Sraḳ" (Barren Trees) (i. 32)
 "Bar Ḥalafta" (ii. 71)
 "Dappim Meḳuṭṭa'im" (Loose Leaves) (v. 120).

He also contributed to the same periodical the following biographical sketches:
 Moritz Lazarus (iv. 214)
 Rabbi Moritz Güdemann (iv. 219)
 Theodor Herzl (v. 222)
 Israel Zangwill (v. 233)
 Max Nordau (v. 247)

References

Further reading 
 
 Chaim David Lippe, Bibliographisches Lexicon s.v.;
 Moïse Schwab, Répertoire des Articles d'Histoire et de Littérature Juive, part i, s.v.
 Simon Rawidowicz, BRAININ, RUBEN, Jüdisches Lexikon, Berlin 1927, vol. 1, col. 1134-1135

1882 births
1939 deaths
People from Dubrowna District
People from Goretsky Uyezd
Belarusian Jews
Jewish Canadian writers
Hebrew-language writers
Belarusian public relations people
German people of Belarusian-Jewish descent
Emigrants from the Russian Empire to Germany
Emigrants from the Russian Empire to Canada
Emigrants from the Russian Empire to the United States
Belarusian biographers
German male writers